Minnesota State Highway 123 (MN 123) is a  highway in east-central Minnesota, which runs from its first intersection with State Highway 23 at Sandstone and continues east and then north to its northern terminus at its second intersection with State Highway 23 near Askov.  The route passes through the city of Sandstone, Sandstone Township, and Finlayson Township.

Route description
Highway 123 serves as an east–west and north–south route between Sandstone and Askov in east-central Minnesota.

The route changes direction to north–south in Sandstone Township and continues as north–south to its northern terminus in Finlayson Township near Askov.

Highway 123 passes briefly through Banning State Park.  The park entrance is located on nearby Highway 23, east of Interstate 35 near Askov.

The route is legally defined as Route 185 in the Minnesota Statutes. It is not marked with this number.

History
Highway 123 was originally part of State Highway 23 from 1934 to 1946.  Highway 23 originally ran through the center of Sandstone on Main Street and Third Street.  Highway 123 now follows this route and was signed in 1946.

Highway 123 was numbered as a derivative of Highway 23.

The east-west portion of the highway was paved when it was marked. The north-south segment was paved in 1949.

Major intersections

References

External links

 Highway 123 at the Unofficial Minnesota Highways Page.

123
Transportation in Pine County, Minnesota